is a Japanese actor and voice actor, represented by Haikyō. He is best known for his role of Clear in the Dramatical Murder franchise.

On October 5, 2020, it was announced Nakazawa had tested positive for COVID-19, but was asymptomatic.

Filmography

Anime
2003
Reborn to Master the Blade: From Hero-King to Extraordinary Squire Theodore
Ai Yori Aoshi as Young Boy
Dear Boys as Student

2009
Fullmetal Alchemist: Brotherhood as Soldier

2013
Silver Spoon as Naoki Toyoda

2014
Jinsei as Kaname Ashitagawa
Dramatical Murder as Clear
Haikyu!! as Kenji Futakuchi

2015
Haikyu!! 2nd Season as Kenji Futakuchi
Ranpo Kitan: Game of Laplace as Keiji A. Yajiuma
Hetalia: The World Twinkle as Hutt River

2017
Mobile Suit Gundam: Iron-Blooded Orphans as Arianerod Fleet Soldier
Fuuka as Kankyaku
Kirakira PreCure a la Mode as Ryuta Yokogawa
Sakura Quest as Nakayama
ID-0 as Operator C
Princess Principal as Eric

2019
Given as Haruki Nakayama

2020
The Titan's Bride as Baro Barows
Noblesse as Tao

2021
Wonder Egg Priority as Shuichiro Sawaki

2022
Blue Lock as Wataru Kuon

OVAs 
2014
BLB as Yuhito Baba

2017
Landreaall

2018
Yarichin Bitch Club as Itsuki Shikatani

Videogames 
2012
PhaseD as Haruka Kuze
Project X Zone as Various
Dramatical Murder as Clear

2013
Dramatical Murder re:connect as Clear

2014
Dramatical Murder re:code as Clear

2020
Ensemble Stars! as Tatsumi Kazehaya

2022
NU:carnival as Yakumo

References

External links
 Official agency profile 
 

1983 births
Living people
Japanese male video game actors
Japanese male voice actors
Male voice actors from Tokyo Metropolis
People from Nerima
21st-century Japanese male actors